Beach handball men's  tournament at the 2021 Southeast Asian Games is scheduled to be held from 6 to 11 May 2022 in Hạ Long, Quảng Ninh, Vietnam. There are four participating teams. A double round robin format was adopted.

Results

All times at local

See also
Handball at the 2021 Southeast Asian Games

References

Handball at the 2021 Southeast Asian Games
Beach handball at multi-sport events